Agios Dimitrios is a village of the Dio-Olympos municipality. Before the 2011 local government reform it was part of the municipality of East Olympos. The 2011 census recorded 14 inhabitants in the village. Agios Dimitrios is a part of the community of Poroi.

See also
 List of settlements in the Pieria regional unit

References

Populated places in Pieria (regional unit)